The 2018 NCAA Division I Field Hockey Championship is the 38th annual tournament organized by the NCAA, to determine the national champion of Division I women's college field hockey in the United States. 

The semifinals and championship match will be played at Trager Stadium at the University of Louisville in Louisville, Kentucky from November 16 to 18, 2018.

Qualified teams

 A total of 18 teams will qualify for the 2018 tournament, the same number of teams as 2017. 10 teams will receive automatic bids by winning their conference tournaments and an additional 8 teams will earn at-large bids based on their regular season records.

Automatic qualifiers

At-large qualifiers

Bracket

See also 
NCAA Division II Field Hockey Championship
NCAA Division III Field Hockey Championship

References 

NCAA Division I Field Hockey Championship
NCAA Division I Field Hockey Championship
NCAA Division I Field Hockey Championship
NCAA Division I Field Hockey Championship